This is a partial list of wooden covered bridges in the U.S. state of Michigan. These covered bridges may be listed on the National Register of Historic Places and as Michigan State Historic Sites.

References

External links

The Covered Bridges of Michigan
Michigan's Historic Sites Online: Bridge Tour

Michigan covered bridges
Bridges, covered
Bridges, covered